Jane Trepp (born 13 March 1988) is a retired Estonian swimmer.

She won a bronze medal in 50 m freestyle at the 2004 European Junior Swimming Championships and a silver medal in 50 m breaststroke at the 2009 European Short Course Swimming Championships.

She is 34-time long course and 15-time short course Estonian swimming champion. She has broken 28 Estonian records in swimming.

Personal
Her sister, Nele, was also a swimmer.

She studied at Louisiana State University, where she was a member of the swimming and diving team, and graduated in 2011. In 2013, she married a fellow LSU athlete and pole vaulter, Kyle Rose.

References

External links
 Player Bio – LSU Tigers

1988 births
Living people
Swimmers from Tallinn
Estonian expatriate sportspeople in the United States
Louisiana State University alumni
LSU Lady Tigers swimmers
Estonian female freestyle swimmers
Estonian female breaststroke swimmers
21st-century Estonian women